Impact centre chrétien is a charismatic Evangelical multi-site megachurch based in Boissy-Saint-Léger, France. It is affiliated with the Communauté des Églises d'expressions africaines en France.

History 
The Church was founded by pastors Yves Castanou and Yvan Castanou twin brothers, in 2002 in Ivry-sur-Seine, near Paris in France. In 2011, the church reached 1,500 people and moved to a new building in Boissy-Saint-Léger. Churches have been planted in Africa, America and Europe. In 2013, it would have 3,500 people. In 2015, the headquarters of Boissy-Saint-Léger had 2,000 people.

Beliefs 
The Church has a charismatic confession of faith.

External links

References 

Content in this edit is translated from the existing French Wikipedia article at :fr:Impact centre chrétien; see its history for attribution.

Evangelical megachurches in France
Pentecostal multisite churches